Iolaus handmani is a butterfly in the family Lycaenidae. It is found in Malawi.

References

Butterflies described in 1965
Iolaus (butterfly)
Endemic fauna of Malawi
Butterflies of Africa